Harmotome is a mineral, one of the rarer zeolites; a hydrated barium silicate with formula: (Ba0.5,Ca0.5,Na,K)5Al5,Si11O32·12(H2O). It forms vitreous white well defined monoclinic crystals, often associated with calcite and other zeolites. It has a Mohs hardness of 4 to 5 and a specific gravity of 2.44 to 2.5.

Name and discovery
It was first described in 1801 from an occurrence in the Harz Mountains, Lower Saxony, Germany.

Location
Like other zeolites, harmotome occurs with calcite in the amygdaloidal cavities of volcanic rocks, for example, in the dolerites of Dumbartonshire, and as fine crystals in the agate-lined cavities in the melaphyre of Oberstein in Germany. It also occurs in gneiss, and sometimes in metalliferous veins. At Sankt Andreasberg in the Harz it is found in the lead and silver veins; and at Strontian in Argyll in lead veins, associated with brewsterite (a strontium and barium zeolite), barytes and calcite.

References

Mindat w/ locations
Webmineral
Dictionary.com

Barium minerals
Calcium minerals
Sodium minerals
Potassium minerals
Aluminium minerals
Zeolites
Monoclinic minerals
Minerals in space group 11